Fiona Hayes-Renshaw is an Irish academic, and since 2001 visiting professor at the College of Europe in Bruges.

She studied at the College of Europe (Jean Rey Promotion 1983–1984) and has a PhD in International Relations from the London School of Economics (1991). She has worked as a researcher at Chatham House, been press and information officer at the European Round Table of Industrialists in Brussels 1989–1991 and been Professor at the Université libre de Bruxelles 1991–1992 and the College of Europe, Natolin 1997–2001.

She is the author of The Council of Ministers (with Helen Wallace) (Palgrave Macmillan, 2006).

References

Alumni of the London School of Economics
Irish scholars and academics
College of Europe alumni
Academic staff of the College of Europe
Living people
Chatham House people
Year of birth missing (living people)
Academic staff of the Université libre de Bruxelles